Asteroceras stellare, the true star ammonite, is an extinct species of cephalopod belonging to the Ammonite subclass and to the family Arietitidae.

These fast-moving nektonic carnivores lived during the lower Jurassic period, around 196.5 to 189.6 million years ago.

Description

Distribution
Fossils of this species may be found in the Jurassic of Germany, Hungary and United Kingdom.

References

Arietitidae
Jurassic ammonites